Ann Taylor (born 1 November 1936 in Stafford, Staffordshire) is an actress, hostess and singer who appeared on British television in the 1950s and 1960s.

Life
Taylor attended a Hertfordshire stage school while a teenager. Soon she made her professional stage debut in the pantomime The Sleeping Beauty at Salisbury. After stage school, she appeared in a summer show at Folkestone.

Career
Taylor was a member of a TV dancing troupe Toppers. Then she came in the West End of London for work in cabaret. She was engaged as the NAAFI girl in series The Army Game (1957-1961), and this led to film and television work. In 1959 she did a season of repertory at Cheltenham. Also for six weeks from September to December 1959 she was relief presenter along with Christopher Trace, on the BBC children's programme 'Blue Peter' for an absent Leila Williams.https://en.wikipedia.org/wiki/List_of_Blue_Peter_presenters#cite_note-30

Family
Taylor is the daughter of an architect. She was married to Border Television programme director John Holdsworth.

References

External links
 

1936 births
Living people
20th-century British actresses
People from Stafford